railway station (formerly Barmouth Junction) is an unstaffed station located on the outskirts of the village of Arthog in Gwynedd, Wales, on the Cambrian Coast line between  and . Built by the Aberystwith and Welsh Coast Railway in 1865, it was formerly the junction station for the Ruabon to Barmouth Line. Since the closure of the Ruabon to Barmouth line in 1965, it remains open, as a minor station on the Cambrian Line.

History

The station was built by the Aberystwith  and Welsh Coast Railway and opened on 3 July 1865 as Barmouth Junction. From 1899 to 1903 there was a connection with the Barmouth Junction and Arthog Tramway.

The station was host to a GWR camp coach from 1934 to 1939. A camping coach was also positioned here by the Western Region from 1956 to 1962. In 1963 the administration of camping coaches at the station was taken over by the London Midland, there were three coaches here in 1963 and 1964 and two from 1965 to 1968.

On 13 June 1960	it was renamed .

Background 

 is mainly used by passengers travelling to Barmouth from south of the  Estuary: parking at the station and taking the train to Barmouth is often much quicker than the 20-mile road journey via . Originally a four-platform station, it is now a single platform unstaffed halt. Trains stop on request.

 is often quoted as an example of a notable feature of the Great Western Railway in Wales, namely its inheritance of junctions in unlikely and inconvenient locations.

Facilities
The station has very few facilities. There is a payphone on the platform, but there are no toilets or help points available. There is a small waiting shelter and a car park with 20 spaces.

Services

References

Notes

Sources

Further reading

External links

 Past and present photos of  station

Railway stations in Gwynedd
DfT Category F2 stations
Former Cambrian Railway stations
Railway stations in Great Britain opened in 1865
Railway stations served by Transport for Wales Rail
Railway request stops in Great Britain
Rail junctions in Wales
Arthog
1865 establishments in Wales